Economic and Social Council might refer to:

 Economic, Social and Cultural Council, an advisory body of the African Union
 Economic and Social Council (Arab League), an institution of the Arab League 
 Social and Economic Council, an advisory council of the Dutch government
 European Economic and Social Committee, a consultative body of the European Union
 French Economic, Social and Environmental Council, a consultative assembly
 Economic and Social Council (Spain), an advisory body of the Government of Spain
 Economic and Social Research Council, one of the seven Research Councils in the United Kingdom
 United Nations Economic and Social Council (ECOSOC), one of the principal organs of the United Nations
 Economic and Social Council (Dominican Republic), an advisory body of the Government of the Dominican Republic